NBCUniversal Media, LLC is an American multinational mass media and entertainment conglomerate corporation owned by Comcast and headquartered at 30 Rockefeller Plaza in Midtown Manhattan, New York City, United States.<ref>{{cite web|url=http://www.marketwatch.com/story/nbc-universal-to-sell-burbank-calif-studio-site-report|title=NBC Universal to sell Burbank, Calif, studio|date=October 11, 2007|website=MarketWatch|access-date=August 28, 2009}}</ref>

NBCUniversal is primarily involved in the media and entertainment industry. The company is named for its two most significant divisions, the National Broadcasting Company (NBC) – one of the United States' Big Three television networks – and the major Hollywood film studio Universal Pictures. It also has a significant presence in broadcasting through a portfolio of domestic and international properties, including USA, Syfy, Bravo, E!, Telemundo (Spanish), Universal Kids, and the streaming service Peacock. Via its Universal Destinations & Experiences division, NBCUniversal is also the third-largest operator of amusement parks in the world. Since 2018, its sister company under Comcast's control, Sky Group Limited, holds its media and telecommunication assets.

NBCUniversal was formed on May 11, 2004, beginning on November 8, 2004 as NBC Universal, Inc., with the merger of General Electric's NBC with Vivendi Universal's film and television subsidiary Vivendi Universal Entertainment, after GE had acquired 80% of the subsidiary, giving Vivendi a 20% share of the new company. In 2011, Comcast attained 51% and thereby the control of newly reformed NBCUniversal, by purchasing shares from GE, while GE bought out Vivendi. Since 2013, the company has been wholly owned by Comcast, which bought GE's ownership stake.

History
Early history
NBC and Universal Television had a partnership dating back to 1950, when Universal Television's earliest ancestor, Revue Studios, produced a number of shows for NBC, although Revue would have hits on other networks as well. This partnership continued throughout a number of name changes and changes of ownership.

Television

NBC Universal Television has its modern roots in a series of expansions undertaken by NBC. In the late 1980s, NBC began pursuing a strategy of diversification, including the formation of two NBC-owned cable-television networks: CNBC and America's Talking. NBC also had partial ownership of several regional sports channels and other cable channels such as American Movie Classics and Court TV (until 2007).

In 1995, NBC began operating NBC Desktop Video, a financial news service that delivered live video to personal computers. The following year, NBC announced an agreement with Microsoft to create an all-news cable television channel, MSNBC (using its subscriber base from America's Talking network). A separate joint venture with Microsoft included establishing a news website, MSNBC.com (now NBCNews.com).

In 1998, NBC partnered with Dow Jones & Co. The two companies combined their financial news channels outside the US. The new networks included NBC Europe, CNBC Europe, NBC Asia, CNBC Asia, NBC Africa, and CNBC Africa.

In 1999, NBC took a 32% stake in the Paxson group, operator of PAX TV. Five years later, NBC decided to sell its interest in PAX TV and end its relationship with PAX owner, Paxson Communications.

In 2001, NBC acquired the US Spanish-language broadcaster Telemundo, that includes the bilingual Mun2 Television for $1.98 billion. That same year NBC acquired the cable channel Bravo.

Combining with Universal

In 2004, amid a major financial crisis caused by over-expansion, Universal Studios' parent company, Vivendi Universal Entertainment (a division of the French company Vivendi Universal, now Vivendi), decided to sell an 80% stake to NBC's parent company, General Electric. The sale and resulting merger formed NBC Universal. The new company was 80% owned by GE, and 20% owned by Vivendi. The joint venture encompassed Vivendi's US film interests (such as Universal Studios), NBC Universal Television Studio, NBC Universal Television Distribution, production and distribution units, Universal Studios Home Video, Universal Studios Consumer Products Group, Back Lot Music (formerly NBC Records), as well as five theme parks, cable television channels including USA Network, Sci-Fi Channel, the defunct Trio, Cloo (formerly Sleuth) as well as 50% stakes in Canal+ and StudioCanal. Universal Music Group was not included in the deal and is not part of NBC Universal.

On August 2, 2004, the television divisions of NBC and Universal Television were combined to form NBC Universal Television. NBC Studios series bought into the company include the NBC dramas Las Vegas (with DreamWorks SKG), Crossing Jordan, and American Dreams. Universal Network Television bought the Law & Order franchise and The District—in fact, Universal Network Television had co-produced American Dreams with NBC before the merger.
Universal Television Distribution also bought into company include Jerry Springer and Maury.
Entertainment shows produced by the new group include The Tonight Show with Jay Leno, Late Night with Jimmy Fallon, Last Call with Carson Daly, and Saturday Night Live.

The formation of NBC Universal saw the establishment of NBC Universal Cable, which oversees the distribution, marketing, and advertisement sales for thirteen channels (Bravo, Bravo HD+ (eventually renamed Universal HD), Chiller, CNBC, CNBC World, MSNBC, NBC Universo, Syfy, ShopNBC (which became ShopHQ after NBCUniversal sold its stake in the network), Telemundo, Cloo, USA Network, and the Olympic Games on cable). NBC Universal Cable also manages the company's investments in The Weather Channel and TiVo. The cable division also used to operate NBC Weather Plus until 2008. It also owned a 50% stake in Canal+ and also owned a 15% stake in A+E Networks until 2012.

Global expansion

In the early 1990s, NBC began its expansion throughout Europe by creating CNBC Europe and its long-time successful NBC Europe Superstation by broadcasting NBC Giga throughout Germany and the rest of the European Union. NBC Europe helped to develop the Leipzig-based Games Convention, the largest European video game exposition with more than 100,000 visitors each year.

In 2005, NBC Universal joined HANA, the High-Definition Audio-Video Network Alliance to help establish standards in consumer electronics interoperability. Later that year, NBC Universal announced a partnership with Apple Computer to offer shows from all the NBC Universal TV networks on Apple's iTunes Store.

In January 2006, NBC Universal launched a new cable channel, Sleuth. The channel's programming dedicated to mystery/crime genre. Sleuth Network's initial slogan was "Mystery. Crime. All The Time." In early 2008, the channel unveiled a new slogan, "Get Clued In." On August 15, 2011, Sleuth rebranded as Cloo, in order to be able to trademark and own the name, as NBCUniversal cannot so with the name Clue (as Hasbro owns the rights to it with their board game Clue). NBCUniversal also explained that another reason for the name change was the word "Sleuth" is too common for search engines (a Google search brings up over 9,530,000 results).Exclusive: Newly Rebranded Cloo TV Picks Up First Original Series TV Guide July 15, 2011

One year later after Sleuth's debut, NBC Universal announced that the company would launch a horror-themed cable channel, Chiller, on March 1, 2007. At launch Chiller would be available exclusively on DirecTV. The network would feature films like Psycho and The Shining and TV series that include Twin Peaks, Alfred Hitchcock Presents, Freddy's Nightmares, Friday the 13th: The Series, War of the Worlds and Tales from the Crypt. NBC Universal also stated that, aside from the content in their own vaults, Chiller will feature content from other studios as well. In 2009, Chiller unveiled a new slogan, "scary good". This replaced the channel's previous slogan "Dare To Watch".

On June 14, 2007, NBC Universal Television Studio was renamed Universal Media Studios. The company explained that the reason for the name change was because "the new name fully describes the company's mission to be the premier content provider for television and digital platforms, spanning all television dayparts and creative genres."

In August 2007, NBC Universal purchased Sparrowhawk Media Group and renamed it NBC Universal Global Networks. This acquisition gave NBC Universal all Hallmark channels outside the United States, plus the English channels Diva TV, Movies 24, Hallmark Channel and KidsCo. Later that fall, the company also acquired the Oxygen network in a separate $925 million deal. The sale was completed one month later.

In the summer of 2008, NBC Universal, Blackstone Group and Bain Capital announced their intentions to buy The Weather Channel from Landmark Communications. The deal closed on September 12, 2008. Shortly after the acquisition completed, NBC announced that their existing TV weather network, NBC Weather Plus, would be shut down by December 31, 2008.

In July 2008, Universal Cable Productions split off from Universal Media Studios and moved into NBCUniversal's NBCU Cable Entertainment division.

The summer of 2008 marked NBC Universal's first venture into the United Kingdom by acquiring English television production company Carnival Films.

On November 12, 2008, NBC Universal acquired 80.1% of Geneon Entertainment from Dentsu in Japan, merging it with Universal Pictures International Entertainment to form a new company, Geneon Universal Entertainment Japan.

On March 16, 2009, NBC Universal-owned cable channel Sci Fi announced that it would be changing its name to Syfy, replacing a generic term with a proprietary brand name that was able to be trademarked. The re-branding and name change took place on July 7, 2009.Syfy: Not Your Father's Sci-Fi , Fortune, July 7, 2009

On August 27, 2009, A&E Television Networks (A&E) merged with Lifetime Entertainment Services (Lifetime),A&E Networks, Lifetime Merger Completed, Broadcasting & Cable, August 27, 2009 giving NBC Universal an equal share of both Lifetime and A&E with The Walt Disney Company and Hearst.

On October 20, 2010, NBC Universal-owned horror/suspense-themed cable channel Chiller announced a major rebranding campaign incorporating a new logo and on-air look that launched on Wednesday, October 27, 2010.Chiller Announces Major Redesign , TV By the Numbers, October 20, 2010 Syfy and Chiller President Dave Howe said, "We have very ambitious plans to grow this network as a brand."

Comcast era (2011–present) 

On December 3, 2009, after months of rumors, a deal was formally announced in which Comcast would buy a stake in NBC Universal from GE for $6.5 billion after the spin-off of certain businesses, pending regulatory approval. Under the agreement, NBC Universal would be controlled with a 51% stake by Comcast and GE would retain the remaining 49%. The deal includes a provision under which Comcast must contribute $7.5 billion in programming including regional sports networks and cable channels such as Golf Channel, Versus, PBS Kids Sprout and E! Entertainment Television. GE used some of the funds, $5.8 billion, to buy out Vivendi's 20% minority stake in NBC Universal. Under the terms of the deal, Comcast reserves the right to buy out GE's share at certain times, and GE reserves the right to force the sale of their stake within the first seven years.  Vivendi completed the initial transaction on September 27, 2010, selling a $2 billion stake to GE (approximately 7.66%).

U.S. regulators approved the proposed sale on January 18, 2011, with conditions. Comcast would have to give up NBC control over online video site Hulu and ensure NBC Universal programming is available to competing cable operators. The company unveiled a new logo designed by Wolff Olins, which replaced a logo featuring the NBC peacock and an invocation of the Universal Pictures globe, with a wordmark. The company also began to stylize its name in CamelCase as "NBCUniversal" rather than "NBC Universal", to reflect the unity of its two main divisions.

On January 26, 2011, Vivendi sold the remaining 20% of NBC Universal to GE, giving GE complete control of the company ahead of the completion of the sale of 51% of the company to Comcast on January 28, 2011. Comcast and GE formed the joint venture holding company NBCUniversal, LLC. NBC Universal, Inc. became a wholly owned subsidiary of the holding company and adopted the name, NBCUniversal Media, LLC, on January 29, 2011.

Comcast had planned to buy out GE's 49% stake over the following seven years, but ownership of NBCUniversal remained split at 51–49% for two years, until the February 12, 2013 announcement that Comcast intended to complete the $16.7 billion purchase early, all at once. The sale was completed on March 19, 2013.

The corporation on July 19, 2012, formed the NBCUniversal News Group with the NBC News, CNBC, and MSNBC divisions.

In February 2013, NBCUniversal merged its two cable divisions, NBCUniversal Cable Entertainment & Cable Studios and NBCUniversal Entertainment & Digital Networks and Integrated Media, into one unit while moving out Telemundo and Mun2 to a new division, NBCUniversal Hispanic Enterprises and Content. The move also created the corporate-level position of executive vice president in charge of digital ventures. In July, the company placed NBC TV Stations and Telemundo's O&Os stations into a new division, NBCUniversal Owned Television Stations, with New England Cable News being transferred into NBC TV Stations.

On April 28, 2016, NBCUniversal officially announced its intent to acquire DreamWorks Animation for $3.8 billion. Universal Pictures took over the distribution for DreamWorks Animation films after their deal with 20th Century Fox expired. The sale was approved by board members, but was subject to regulatory approval. On June 21, 2016, the acquisition was approved by the United States Department of Justice. On August 22, 2016, the deal was completed, and DreamWorks Animation is now a wholly owned subsidiary of NBCUniversal. This gave Universal Pictures distribution to both DreamWorks Animation and Illumination films beginning in 2019.

On February 15, 2017, Universal Studios acquired a minority stake in Amblin Partners, strengthening the relationship between Universal and Amblin, and reuniting a minority percentage of the DreamWorks Pictures label with DreamWorks Animation.

On February 28, 2017, NBCUniversal announced that it would acquire the remaining 49% stake in the Universal Studios Japan theme park that it did not own.

On May 1, 2017, NBCUniversal announced that Sprout would be relaunched as Universal Kids on September 9, 2017. Universal Pictures' acquisition of DreamWorks Animation in 2016 would also be leveraged by Universal Kids to bolster its programming. Industry observers felt that the integration of DreamWorks IP with Universal Kids would help NBCUniversal establish a viable multi-platform competitor to other major children's networks (such as Paramount's Nickelodeon, Warner Bros. Discovery's Cartoon Network, and Disney Channel).

On May 10, 2017, NBCUniversal announced that it had acquired Denver-based online platform Craftsy for its Cable Entertainment Group division.

Attempted takeover of 21st Century Fox assets and Comcast's subsequent acquisition of Sky
On November 16, 2017, NBCUniversal's parent company Comcast made a bid to acquire 21st Century Fox's filmed entertainment, cable entertainment, and international assets, ten days after The Walt Disney Company (at the time, owners of rival network ABC, cable sports channel ESPN and theme park Walt Disney World) was reported to be negotiating with Fox for the same assets. The deal contained key assets such as the 20th Century Fox film and television studios, 30% stake in Hulu, television assets FX Networks, National Geographic Channel, and international television operations such as Star India, while excluding the Fox Broadcasting Company, the Fox News Channel, Fox Television Stations, Fox Business Network, Fox Sports 1 and 2, Fox Deportes, and the Big Ten Network, all of which were spun off into the "New Fox" company (later known as the Fox Corporation) run by the Murdoch family.

However, on December 11, 2017, Comcast officially dropped the bid, saying that "We never got the level of engagement needed to make a definitive offer.” On December 14, 2017, Disney officially confirmed its acquisition of the most 21st Century Fox assets, which was granted approval from the United States Department of Justice Antitrust Division on June 27, 2018, and approved by stockholders from both companies one month later.

On April 25, 2018, Comcast launched its takeover offer for Sky plc at £12.50 per-share, or approximately £22.1 billion. 21st Century Fox owned a significant stake in Sky and was trying to take full control of it itself, ahead of its own acquisition by The Walt Disney Company. NBCUniversal CEO Steve Burke stated that purchasing Sky would roughly double its presence in English-speaking markets, and allow for synergies between the respective networks and studios of NBCUniversal and Sky. On June 5, 2018, Culture Secretary Matt Hancock cleared both 21st Century Fox and Comcast's respective offers to acquire Sky plc. Fox's offer was contingent on the divestiture of Sky News. On June 15, 2018, the European Commission gave antitrust clearance to Comcast's offer to purchase Sky, citing that in terms of their current assets in Europe, there would be limited impact on competition. Comcast included a 10-year commitment to the operations and funding of Sky News. On July 11, 2018, Fox increased its bid for Sky to £14.00 per-share, valuing it at £24.5 billion. Comcast subsequently counterbid just hours later with an offer at £14.75 per-share, valued at £26 billion.

On September 20, 2018, the Panel on Takeovers and Mergers ordered that a blind auction be held "in order to provide an orderly framework for the resolution of this competitive situation". In this process, Fox, followed by Comcast, made new cash-only bids for Sky. After these first two rounds of bidding, there would be a third round where both companies could make new offers. However, the third round of bidding would only be binding if both companies make a bid. Comcast won the auction with a bid of £17.28 per-share, beating Fox's bid of £15.67. Sky plc had until October 11, 2018, to formally accept this offer.

Following its auction victory, Comcast began to acquire Sky shares from the open market. On September 26, 2018, Fox subsequently announced its intent to sell all of its shares in Sky plc to Comcast for £12 billion. On October 4. 2018, Fox completed the sale of their shares, giving Comcast a 76.8% controlling stake at the time. On October 12, 2018, Comcast announced it will compulsorily acquire the rest of Sky after its bid gained acceptances from 95.3% of the broadcaster's shareholders with the company being delisted by early 2019. Sky was delisted on November 7, 2018, after Comcast acquired all remaining shares.

While NBCUniversal and Sky still operate mainly as separate entities within Comcast, following the Sky takeover Comcast has begun the process of integrating some of NBCUniversal's international operations with parts of Sky. Among other moves, NBCUniversal's pay television channels in the United Kingdom will be folded with Sky's, and Sky Deutschland will become the parent company of NBCU's German networks.

Preparation of Peacock streaming service

On January 14, 2019, NBCUniversal announced that it will launch an over-the-top streaming service to compete with Netflix, CBS All Access, Amazon Prime Video, Hulu, Apple TV+, HBO Max, and Disney+. A reorganization of the major direct reporting division was made. Bonnie Hammer was appointed chairman of NBCUniversal Direct-to-Consumer and Digital Enterprises via the streaming services and the Digital Enterprises unit. Her former unit, NBCUniversal Cable Entertainment Group, was given to Mark Lazarus as chairman, NBCUniversal Broadcast, Cable, Sports and News. Universal Filmed Entertainment Group chairman Jeff Shell added NBC Entertainment, Telemundo and international channels as chairman of NBCUniversal Film and Entertainment. On September 17, 2019, NBCUniversal announced the service would be called Peacock and is expected to launch in July 2020.

NBCUniversal Content Studios was formed in October 2019 with Hammer as chairman and George Cheeks as vice chairman, who was co-chairman of NBC Entertainment. This new unit consists of Universal Television and Universal Content Productions. Hammer was replaced as chairman of the Direct-to-Consumer and Digital Enterprises unit by Comcast executive Matt Strauss, while Paul Telegdy would become sole chairman of NBC Entertainment and continue reporting to Shell.

On February 25, 2020, Comcast announced it would purchase Xumo from the Panasonic/Viant joint venture for an undisclosed sum. The acquisition of the service—which will continue to operate as an independent business, albeit within Comcast's cable television division—stems mainly from Xumo's partnerships with smart TV manufacturers (including LG, Panasonic, and Vizio), which would allow Comcast to use Xumo's placement to market or showcase Xfinity and other Comcast services as well as use its technology to develop additional streaming platforms. The company plans to add content from the NBCUniversal programming library and the company's various television networks as well as use it to upsell its free/subscription hybrid service Peacock, akin to ViacomCBS's utilization of Pluto TV to offer content from its cable networks following the former Viacom's purchase of the rival streamer in the Spring of 2019.

Vudu acquisition
In February 2020, it was reported that Comcast (via NBCUniversal) had entered talks into acquiring Vudu from Walmart.  On April 20, 2020, Fandango (owned by NBCUniversal and Warner Bros. Discovery) announced that they would be acquiring Vudu. The acquisition was completed on July 6, 2020.

 Notable people 
Jeff Shell, Chief Executive Officer
 Matt Bond, Chairman, Content Distribution
 Matt Schnaars, President
 Cesar Conde, Chairman, NBCUniversal News Group
 Rashida Jones, President, MSNBC
 Noah Oppenheim, President, NBC News
 KC Sullivan, President, CNBC
 Bonnie Hammer, Vice Chairman
 Kimberley D. Harris, Executive Vice President of Comcast Corporation and General Counsel of NBCUniversal
 Pearlena Igbokwe, Chairman, Universal Studio Group
 Jimmy Horowitz, Vice Chairman, Business Affairs & Operations
 Kathy Kelly‑Brown, Senior Vice President, Strategic Initiatives, Comcast Cable and NBCUniversal
 Anand Kini, Chief Financial Officer
 Donna Langley, Chairman, Universal Filmed Entertainment Group
 Jimmy Horowitz, Vice Chairman, Business Affairs & Operations
 Peter Levinsohn, Vice Chairman & Chief Distribution Officer
 Mark Lazarus, Chairman, NBCUniversal Television and Streaming
 Frances Berwick, Chairman, Entertainment Networks
 Pete Bevacqua, Chairman, NBC Sports Group
 Beau Ferrari, Chairman, NBCUniversal Telemundo Enterprises
 Jimmy Horowitz, Vice Chairman, Business Affairs & Operations
 Susan Rovner, Chairman, Entertainment Content
 Valari Dobson Staab, Chairman, NBCUniversal Local
 Matt Strauss, Chairman, Direct-to-Consumer and International
 Kelly Campbell, President, Peacock and Direct to Consumer
 Adam Miller, Chief Administration Officer, Comcast Corporation and Executive Vice President, NBCUniversal
 Jen Friedman, Executive Vice President, Communications, NBCUniversal
 Ian Trombley, President, Operations & Technology, NBCUniversal
 Vicki Williams, Chief Human Resources Officer
 Craig Robinson, Executive Vice President, Chief Diversity Officer
 Mark Woodbury, Chairman and Chief Executive Officer, Universal Destinations & Experiences
 Tom Mehrmann, President, Chief Operating Officer Universal Destinations & Experiences, Pacific Rim
 Linda Yaccarino, Chairman, Global Advertising and Partnerships

Assets

Libraries
 NBCUniversal Film & Entertainment 
 Universal Pictures catalog
 Universal International Studios film catalog
 Carnival Films film catalog
 Universal 1440 Entertainment catalog
 Universal Animation Studios catalog
 DreamWorks Animation catalog
 Illumination catalog
 Illumination Studios Paris catalog
 Focus Features catalog
 Good Machine catalog 
 Gramercy Pictures catalog
 October Films catalog
 USA Films catalog
 Universal Focus/Universal Classics catalog 
 FilmDistrict catalog 
Savoy Pictures catalog
 Focus World catalog 
 Working Title Films catalog
 post-March 31, 1996 PolyGram Filmed Entertainment catalog
 Propaganda Films catalog (post-March 31, 1996)
 Interscope Communications catalog (post-March 31, 1996)
 Island Pictures catalog (post-March 31, 1996) 
 Vision Video catalog (post-March 31, 1996) 
 A&M Films catalog (post-March 31, 1996) 
 Castle Films/Universal 8 catalog 
 Amblin Partners catalog
 Amblin Entertainment catalog (only films released by Universal)
 post-2016 DreamWorks Pictures catalog
 Blumhouse Productions catalog (minority stake) 
 Back Lot Music catalog
 OTL Releasing catalog 
 Peacock original films catalog

 NBCUniversal Television and Streaming 
 Universal Television catalog
 Revue Studios catalog
 MCA TV catalog
 MTE catalog
 Multimedia Entertainment catalog 
 PolyGram Television catalog (post-1996) 
 Universal International Studios television series catalog 
 Heyday Television catalog (joint venture with Heyday Films) 
 Chocolate Media catalog 
 Lark Productions catalog
 Lucky Giant catalog
 Monkey Kingdom catalog
 Matchbox Pictures catalog 
 Carnival Films television series catalog
 EMKA, Ltd.
 1929–1949 Paramount Pictures catalog
 Working Title Television catalog
 Telemundo original programming 
 Amblin Television catalog, (except productions with other companies)
 post-2008 DreamWorks Television catalog (except productions with other companies)
 NBC Productions catalog (In the House and The Fresh Prince of Bel-Air are distributed by Warner Bros. Television Studios due to a pre-NBCU syndication deal)
 NBC Enterprises catalog 
 NBC International catalog
 DreamWorks Animation Television catalog
 DreamWorks Classics/Classic Media catalog
 UPA catalog
 Several Godzilla films under license from Toho
 Harvey Entertainment catalog
 Famous Studios catalog, excluding properties owned by other companies and licensed to Paramount's Famous Studios
 Western Publishing/Golden Books/Gold Key Comics/Golden Book Video catalog
 Broadway Video's former family entertainment catalog
 Rankin/Bass Productions catalog (pre-1974)
 Total Television catalog
 Tomorrow Entertainment catalog (pre-1974) 
 Shari Lewis' two PBS series (Lamb Chop's Play Along and Charlie Horse Music Pizza)
 CST Entertainment catalog 
 Big Idea Entertainment catalog (VeggieTales, 3-2-1 Penguins!, Larryboy: The Cartoon Adventures)
 Entertainment Rights catalog
 Carrington Productions International catalog 
 Link Entertainment catalog 
 Filmation catalog (with some exceptions for licensed properties)
 Tell-Tale Productions catalog (including Boo! but excluding the rights to Tweenies)
 Woodland Animations catalog (including Postman Pat, Gran, Bertha and Charlie Chalk)
 Chapman Entertainment catalog (including Fifi and the Flowertots, Roary the Racing Car and Raa Raa the Noisy Lion)
 Walter Lantz Productions catalog 
 NBC News catalog
 CNBC catalog
 MSNBC catalog 
 Peacock Productions catalog
 Peacock original television series catalog
 USA Cable Entertainment catalog
 Syfy originals catalog
 Bravo originals catalog
 E! originals catalog
 Oxygen originals catalog 
 Universal Kids originals catalog 
 G4 Media catalog
 Style/Esquire Network originals catalog
 Chiller originals catalog 
 Cloo originals catalog
 Trio originals catalog (post-2000)
 Fearnet originals catalog (excluding series produced by Sony Pictures Television and Lionsgate Television)
 Sky Vision catalog

Joint ventures
 Bullwinkle Studios, a joint venture with Jay Ward Productions to produce and manage the Jay Ward catalog (including The Rocky and Bullwinkle Show, Mr. Peabody & Sherman, and George of the Jungle'') DreamWorks' partnership with Bullwinkle Studios ended in February 2022, when the Ward estate partnered with WildBrain. DreamWorks will continue to own its co-productions with Bullwinkle Studios.

See also 

 List of conglomerates
 Comcast
 General Electric 
 Vivendi Universal

References

External links

 
2004 establishments in New York City
American companies established in 2004
Mass media companies established in 2004
Entertainment companies of the United States
Mass media companies of the United States
Entertainment companies based in New York City
Mass media companies based in New York City
Companies based in Los Angeles County, California
Comcast subsidiaries
Former General Electric subsidiaries
Former Vivendi subsidiaries
Universal City, California
2011 mergers and acquisitions